Melanotransferrin is a protein that in humans is encoded by the MFI2 gene. MFI2 has also recently been designated CD228 (cluster of differentiation 228).

The protein encoded by this gene is a cell-surface glycoprotein found on melanoma cells. The protein shares sequence similarity and iron-binding properties with members of the transferrin superfamily. The importance of the iron binding function has not yet been identified. This gene resides in the same region of chromosome 3 as members of the transferrin superfamily. Alternative splicing results in two transcript variants. It is part of neural crest tissue, often present in melanotic neuroectodermal tumor of infancy.

References

Further reading

External links
 

Clusters of differentiation
Human proteins